Payne Institute may refer:

Payne Institute, forerunner of Allen University in South Carolina
Payne Institute, forerunner of Payne College in Georgia
Payne Institute, one of the names used for Daniel Payne College in Birmingham, Alabama